Kelly is an unincorporated community in Christian County, Kentucky, in the United States. Kelly is located at  (38.218373, -85.353058), on U.S. Route 41.

History
The community is best known for being the location of the 1955 Kelly-Hopkinsville alien encounter, in which residents reported seeing unidentifiable creatures and lights at a rural farmhouse. In honor of this event, the community hosts the Kelly "Little Green Men" Days festival each year, where visitors can buy "intergalactic souvenirs". The 2017 anniversary and festival coincided with a total solar eclipse.

See also
 Kelly-Hopkinsville encounter

References
 

Unincorporated communities in Christian County, Kentucky
Unincorporated communities in Kentucky